Beena may refer to:

Beena Banerjee, an Indian actress commonly credited as Beena
Beena Sarwar, Pakistani journalist and activist
Beena marriage, a pre-Islamic form of marriage among Arabic nomads
Advanced Pico Beena, an educational console system  by Sega Toys
Beena, a pen name of Parveen Shakir, a Pakistani poet
Beena, Bengali pronunciation for the musical instrument, veena
Beena (film), an Indian Malayalam film released in 1978

See also
 Bina (disambiguation)